Wilson Sons is a Brazilian shipping company headquartered in Rio de Janeiro, Brazil. The firm was set up in Salvador in 1837 by two Scottish brothers, Edward and Fleetwood Pellow Wilson. The firm is one of the oldest private enterprises in Brazil. It was later run by Edward's son, Edward Pellew Wilson Jr.

Wilson Sons were responsible for construction and provision of supplies and equipment for the Great Western and Conde d'Eu Railroads in Brazil. The group built the first dry dock in Brazil, on the Ilha de Mocangue Pequeno Island, inaugurated in 1869 by Emperor Dom Pedro II.

Today, Wilson Sons Limited, through its subsidiaries, is one of Brazil's largest providers of integrated port and maritime logistics and supply chain solutions. The company has developed an extensive national network and provides a comprehensive set of services related to domestic and international trade, as well as to the oil and gas industry. Its principal operating activities are divided into the following lines of business: port terminals, towage, logistics, shipping agency, offshore, and shipyards.

In 2021, the company opened its capital on B3 under ticker symbol PORT3.

References

External links
Wilson, Sons web site (English language)

Brazilian brands
Companies based in Rio de Janeiro (state)
Companies based in Rio de Janeiro (city)
Companies established in 1837
Companies listed on B3 (stock exchange)
Defence companies of Brazil
Engineering companies of Brazil
Manufacturing companies of Brazil
Manufacturing companies established in 1837
Military history of Brazil
Shipbuilding companies of Brazil
Shipping companies of Brazil
Vehicle manufacturing companies established in the 19th century